Gaskell  is a Gaelic surname. The surname related to "Gaisgeil", meaning valorous.

People with the surname 
 Charles George Milnes Gaskell (1842-1919), British lawyer and politician
 Lady Constance Gaskell (1885–1964), British courtier
 David Gaskell (born 1940), British football player
 Dean Gaskell (born 1983), British rugby league player
 Elizabeth Gaskell (1810–1865), British novelist and biographer
 George Gaskell, British social psychologist
 Holbrook Gaskell (1813–1909), British industrialist and collector
 Holbrook Gaskell II (1846-1919), British chemical industrialist
 Holbrook Gaskell III (1878-1951), British chemical industrialist
 James Gaskell, (born 1990), Rugby Union player for Sale Sharks
 James Milnes Gaskell (1810–1873), British Conservative politician
 Jane Gaskell (born 1941), British fantasy novelist
 Lucy Gaskell (born 1980), British actress
 Richard Gaskell, football player
 Walter Holbrook Gaskell (1847–1914), British physiologist
 William Gaskell (1805–1884), British minister and educator
 Whitney Gaskell (born 1972), American novelist

See also
 Gaskill (disambiguation)
 Mary Gaitskill, American author
 Gaitskell

References